Tara Römer (7 June 1974, Lavelanet – 24 November 1999, Paris) was a French actor. He starred in the film Life Is a Long Quiet River (1988).

He was killed in a road accident.

Selected filmography

References

External links
IMDb entry 
Official site

1974 births
1999 deaths
French male film actors
Road incident deaths in France
20th-century French male actors
People from Ariège (department)